The list of ship commissionings in 2008 includes a chronological list of all ships commissioned in 2008.


See also 

2008
 Ship commissionings